is a private junior college in the city of Itami, Hyōgo, Japan. This junior college is part of the Otemae Gakuen Education Group.

History 
The junior college opened in April 1951 in the city of Osaka for women only. In 1986, the campus moved to the city of Itami. The junior college became coeducational in 2004.

Courses  
 Life design: studies for home making

External links

  

Educational institutions established in 1951
Japanese junior colleges
Universities and colleges in Hyōgo Prefecture
Universities and colleges in Osaka Prefecture
Private universities and colleges in Japan
1951 establishments in Japan
Itami, Hyōgo